{{Infobox building
| name                = Villa Heinrich Dietz in Bydgoszcz
| native_name         = 
| image               = Dom (willa), 1897-1898.JPG
| image_alt           = Villa Heinrich Dietz from Gdańska street 
| image_size          = 300
| caption             = View from Gdańska Street
| building_type       = Villa
| classification      = Nr.601301-Reg.A/1128/1-4, 7 July 1992 and 29 September 1998.
| architectural_style = Eclecticism & Neo-Gothic
| structural_system   = 
| cost                = 
| location            = 48 Gdańska Street, Bydgoszcz, 
| client              = Heinrich Dietz
| owner               = 
| landlord            = 
| location_country    = Poland
| coordinates         = 
| altitude            = 
| start_date          = 1897
| topped_out_date     =
| completion_date     = 1898
| opened_date         = 
| inauguration_date   = 
| relocated_date      = 
| renovation_date     = 
| floor_count         = 3
| floor_area          = 
| architect           = Heinrich Seeling
| url                 = 
| references          = 
}}

The Villa Heinrich Dietz is a historical house in downtown Bydgoszcz, also called Villa Flora.

Location
The building stands on eastern side of Gdańska Street at Nr.48, between Krasiński and Słowackiego streets.

History
The villa was built in 1897–1898, from a design by design Berlin architect Heinrich Seeling. Initial address was 146 Danzigerstraße, Bromberg.

The owner of the villa, Heinrich Dietz, was a rentier, member of the city council and member of the Prussian parliament. He was the co-founder of the inland navigation company Lloyd which had its seat located downtown, by the riverside. The house remained in the hands of his heirs until 1937.

During Nazi occupation, the building was the seat of SS municipal headquarters. After 1945, it has been handed over to Pomerania and Kujawy Polish Radio. Afterwards, the villa has been linked by a covered walkway to the adjacent house, the Villa Wilhelm Blumwe.

In 1995, a thorough renovation of the building occurred, which has been rewarded: Pomerania and Kujawy Polish Radio received  a price by the National Heritage Funds in a competition for the best restoration of a historical building.

Architecture
The villa has been built in the eclectic style, with Neo-Gothic elements  and Neo-Renaissance. Perhaps this style was also inspired by the architecture of picturesque English influences. 
The footprint of the building is irregular but rather close to a rectangle.
The outside appearance of the villa is highly fragmented, with various avant-corps, balconies and loggias.

Over the main front elevation (on to Gdańska Street) stands a three-story avant-corps with a balcony, set beneath the gable and the pediment. The second avant-corps located on the northern side  has an indoor loggia covered by a lean-to roof. Bricked railings are decorated with a stylized trefoil shapes.
In facade decoration are also used volutes and obelisk-shaped pinnacles. A beautifully crafted wood-and-metal door can be notice at the main entry.

The name Villa Flora is related to murals adorning the gone loggia.

The interior of the building is decorated with painted friezes - birds and flowers. Also survived until today a magnificent woodwork and panelling, the ceiling with gold decorations, all made in papier-mâché technique. 
The backyard (eastern side of the building) is adjacent to a small garden associated with Villa Wilhelm Blumwe, where stands an original 19th-century fountain decorated with polychrome sculpture of herons.

The building has been put on the Kuyavian-Pomeranian Voivodeship Heritage List''' Nr.601301 Reg.A/1128/1-4, on 7 July 1992 and 29 September  1998.

Gallery

See also

 Bydgoszcz
 Gdańska Street
 Heinrich Seeling
 Villa Wilhelm Blumwe in Bydgoszcz
  Downtown district in Bydgoszcz

References

Bibliography 
  
  </ref>
  </ref>

Cultural heritage monuments in Bydgoszcz
Buildings and structures on Gdańska Street, Bydgoszcz
Villas in Bydgoszcz
Houses completed in 1898